The 38th National Television Festival (Vietnamese: Liên hoan truyền hình toàn quốc lần thứ 38) was held from December 19 to December 22, 2018, in Đà Lạt City, Lâm Đồng Province. It reviewed and honoured best works of Vietnam's television industry in 2018.

Event

Participation
More than 1000 delegates from 114 television units attended the 38th National Television Festival. In which, 106 units participated in the competition. A total of 497 television works were submitted. The Reportage category continued to attract the most participating works (148 works). This is also a category with fierce competition among contestants with a wide variety of topics, reflecting the current picture of many localities as well as hot issues across the country in the past year.

A notable new feature is that from this festival, dramas with scripts adapted or adapted from foreign literary works will be allowed to participate in the competition. This is also the first year that the documentary genre has expanded to include multi-episodes documentaries.

Activities
The Festival is organized by Vietnam Television in collaboration with Lâm Đồng Radio and Television Station (LTV). This is the first time LTV Lâm Đồng has hosted this event. Many activities took place within the framework of the festival:
 The opening ceremony took place at 20:00 on December 19 at the Labor Culture House of Lâm Đồng province, broadcast live on VTV1 channel.
 Judging and grading the works in contest in Dalat Du Parc Hotel since December 17
 Free screenings from December 19 to 22 at 8 large rooms of Dalat Palace Hotel
 Photo Exhibition: Broadcasters (Vietnamese: "Những người làm truyền hình) opened at 08:30 on December 20 at the flower garden of Dalat Palace Hotel
 Seminars at Dalat Palace Hotel in the morning and afternoon of December 20, respectively:
 Social Network and Television (Vietnamese: "Mạng xã hội và truyền hình")
 Solutions for using portable and compact equipment for program production (Vietnamese: "Giải pháp sử dụng thiết bị cơ động, nhỏ gọn cho sản xuất chương trình")
 The closing and awarding ceremony took place at 20:00 on December 22 at the Labor Culture House of Lâm Đồng province, broadcast live on LTV Lâm Đồng channel, simultaneously reporting online on the information page of the festival and the VTV News electronic newspaper. It is replayed at 14:15 on Sunday (December 23) on channel VTV1.

Awards
At the closing ceremony of the 38th National Television Festival, the organizers awarded 30 Gold prizes, 56 Silver prizes, and 128 Certificates of merit to works in 9 categories. In addition, there are 3 individual awards given to actor, actress and D.O.P in the Drama category.

The list below doesn't include the works received Certificate of Merit:
The double-dagger indicates Short Drama or Multi-episodes Documentary
The dagger indicates Single-episode Drama
Serial Drama and Single-episode Documentary are shown without any dagger icon

Gold Prize

Silver Prize

See also
 2018 Kite Awards
 2018 VTV Awards

References

National Television Festival of Vietnam
2018 in Vietnam
2018 in Vietnamese television